Gerhard Haszprunar (born  25 February 1957 in Vienna) is Austrian zoologist and malacologist.

He is credited with the invention of the modern species naming patronage model and is a founder of the BIOPAT non-profit organization.

Honours and awards
 Cardinal Innitzer prize (for the Habilitation) (1989)
 Prize of the city of Innsbruck for scientific research at the University of Innsbruck for the project "Monoplacophora" (with Dr. Kurt Schaefer) (1994)
 Austrian Cross of Honour for Science and Art (2008)

References 

1957 births
Living people
Scientists from Vienna
Austrian malacologists
Austrian zoologists
Recipients of the Austrian Cross of Honour for Science and Art